The 2007–08 Premier Academy League season is the tenth since its establishment, and the fourth under the current name and make-up. Aston Villa were crowned the 2007–08 Premier Academy League Champions after beating Manchester City 2–0 in the play-off Final, with goals from James Collins and Chris Herd.

Structure

Group A 
Norwich City, Southampton and West Ham United play 20 group fixtures each, twice against all of the other teams in Group A. They also play 8 inter-group fixtures, against teams from Group B, C and D. The remaining 8 teams in the group, play 21 group fixtures - which means a single fixture in the group will be the third meeting between the teams in the season - and 7 inter-group games. Thus producing 28 games a season for all 11 teams.

Groups B, C and D 
All teams play each other in the group twice, producing 18 games. They also play 10 inter-group fixtures.

Final league tables

Academy Group A

Academy Group B

Academy Group C

Academy Group D 

Pld = Matches played; W = Matches won; D = Matches drawn; L = Matches lost; F = Goals for; A = Goals against; GD = Goal difference; Pts = PointsC = Champions; R = Relegated

Play-offs

Semi-finals

Final

See also 
 2007–08 in English football
 Premier League 2007-08
 Premier Reserve League 2007-08

External links 
 Premier Academy League Bulletin
 Premier Academy League 2007-08 Handbook

Premier Academy League
ACadPrem
Academy